Oak Beach–Captree, frequently just called Oak Beach, was a census-designated place (CDP) in the town of Babylon in Suffolk County, New York, United States. The population was 286 at the 2010 census.

Prior to the 2010 census, the area was part of a larger CDP called Gilgo-Oak Beach-Captree, New York. The Oak Beach–Captree CDP consists of some small beach communities on a barrier island along the southern edge of Long Island, including Oak Beach, Oak Island, and Captree Island. As of 2020, Oak Beach–Captree was split into two separate CDPs called Oak Beach and Captree.

Geography

Demographics
The census numbers are presumably for full-time inhabitants; many of these houses are second homes and not primary residences, although the proportion of seasonal residents is decreasing.

The land for these communities is not privately owned, but leased from the Town of Babylon through the year 2065. However, the residences on the property are owned. If the leases are not renewed at some point in the future, the owners will have to move the houses elsewhere, similar to what happened at High Hill Beach when Jones Beach State Park was created.

References

Babylon (town), New York
Beaches of Suffolk County, New York
Robert Moses projects
Census-designated places in New York (state)
Census-designated places in Suffolk County, New York
Islip (town), New York
Populated coastal places in New York (state)